Helgi Biering Daníelsson (16 April 1933 – 1 May 2014) was an Icelandic footballer, playing the goalkeeper position. He was part of the Icelandic men's national football team between 1953 and 1965, playing 25 matches. He won the Icelandic championship three times as a member of ÍA.

Honours

Icelandic Championships: 3
1957, 1958, 1960

See also
List of Iceland international footballers

References

External links

1933 births
2014 deaths
Helgi Daníelsson
Helgi Daníelsson
Association football goalkeepers
Helgi Daníelsson
Helgi Daníelsson